Bobby Gill (born June 25, 1959) is an American former stock car racing driver. He raced for a number of years in the NASCAR Craftsman Truck Series, earning four top-tens in 16 starts.

Pre-NASCAR Career
Prior to racing in NASCAR's national touring series, he found success in NASCAR's All-Pro Series, and was the winner of the ASA's Miller 300 at the Minnesota State Fairgrounds in 1995.

Career
Most of Gill's starts in the NASCAR Craftsman Truck Series came in 1996, when he started off with Spears Motorsports. In his debut with the team, he started 15th and finished 23rd at Homestead-Miami. Then, the very next race at Phoenix, Gill earned his first career top-10 with a ninth-place showing. He would later better that with a 7th at Tucson and Bristol and a 6th at Milwaukee. He also earned one top-10 start at Colorado. Curiously, after an 11th-place finish at Louisville, Gill was released from the team for unspecified reasons. He was running 11th in the points at the time, just thirty points out of tenth.

Gill recovered by joining Billy Ballew Motorsports for three races in later 1996. After finishing 22nd at Nashville, Gill closed out the year with a pair of 11ths, allowing him to finish 21st in points, despite missing ten races during the year.

Gill returned to the series for two starts in 2000. He started 7th in his season debut at Milwaukee before finishing 34th due to a rear end gear failure. He did not fare much better at Memphis, where he crashed to 32nd. Gill has not competed in major NASCAR since.

Post-NASCAR career
Residing in Dalton, Georgia, Gill has carved out a successful niche in the USAR Hooters Pro Cup developmental series where he won three straight championships from 1999 to 2001. Gill added his fourth USAR championship in 2007.

Motorsports career results

NASCAR
(key) (Bold – Pole position awarded by qualifying time. Italics – Pole position earned by points standings or practice time. * – Most laps led.)

Craftsman Truck Series

References

External links
 
 

Living people
1959 births
People from Dalton, Georgia
Racing drivers from Georgia (U.S. state)
NASCAR drivers
CARS Tour drivers
American Speed Association drivers
Sportspeople from Sarasota, Florida
Racing drivers from Florida